Raaz: Reboot is a 2016 Indian horror thriller film written and directed by Vikram Bhatt. It features Emraan Hashmi, Kriti Kharbanda and Gaurav Arora in the lead roles. The film is the fourth  in the horror film series, Raaz.

Raaz: Reboot was released worldwide on 16 September 2016. Principal photography commenced in January 2016 in Romania.

Plot
On 4 January 2016. Rehaan Khanna (Gaurav Arora) and Shaina Khanna (Kriti Kharbanda) return to Romania after a few years of their marriage. Apparently, they had lived there when they were unmarried. But when Rehaan got an offer as a Venture Capitalist for the East European Finance Company, Shaina was insistent that he take up the job. Rehaan was reluctant, since he had a secret to hide.
On the very first day, while unpacking her luggage, Shaina experiences paranormal activities. Rehaan refuses to believe her. A month later, while on a business trip, Rehaan receives a frantic call from Shaina requesting for help. She is found holed up in a telephone booth in a rural area. Apparently, she had gone there to visit a clairvoyant. And hence, the narrative juggles back and forth as to what plagues them and what leads her to the clairvoyant.

The local priest tries to perform an exorcism on Shaina but fails as the spirit knows the priest's past and uses it against him to send him away running. A blind Indian student, Trilok who is studying Psychometry in Romania then enters the scene and then, enters Aditya Srivastava (Emraan Hashmi), to rescue his lady love from the evil spirit. Aditya has some strange premonition about all the events taking place in Shaina's life. He offers to help her to fight the spirit and free her from all the pain she is going through. Although, Shaina doesn't believe him at first, certain series of events make her believe that the spirit has something to do with her husband Rehaan. She finds out that he is keeping a certain secret which has now become the cause of the haunting. Eventually, Rehaan confesses that he had murdered Aditya and the latter's ghost is seeking revenge. Four years ago, just before Shaina's marriage, Aditya had called Rehaan revealing himself as her ex-boyfriend. Aditya had invited Rehaan to his residence and had blackmailed him for insider trading. Aditya told Rehaan he was willing to drop the charges if Rehaan broke off his engagement to Shaina, so that Aditya can rekindle his relationship with her. Rehaan tried to quietly leave but Aditya showed him photos of his intimate moments with Shaina and began to taunt him. Enraged, Rehaan had struck a fatal blow to Aditya on the head, killing him. As Aditya lay dying, he vowed vengeance. The spirit of Aditya then takes complete possession of Shaina's body. To save Shaina from the evil spirit of Aditya, Trilok recites Gajendra moksh stotra. By reciting this mantra, Aditya's evil spirit will have to leave Shaina's body, but there's a condition, that the mantra was to be recited without a break. Though Aditya's spirit stops Trilok and Rehaan from completing the mantra, Rehaan saves Shaina from Aditya. The movie ends with Rehaan and Shaina sitting by the lakeside talking about how there was a lot of ice around their house when they had first arrived but now all of the ice had melted, symbolizing the increased closeness between the couple.

Cast

Emraan Hashmi as  Aditya Srivastava / Aditya Srivastava Evil Spirit Ghost 
Kriti Kharbanda as Shaina Khanna : Rehaan's Wife ,Aditya's Secret Girlfriend (Few lines as Mona Ghosh Shetty)
Gaurav Arora as Rehaan Khanna : Shaina's Husband
Suzanna Mukherjee as Shreya
Tara Sharma as a Gipsy woman / Malini 
Madhu Anand Chandhok as Rehaan's mother
Vlad Udrescu as Mihai
Ashwath Bhatt as Trilok Shas
Hargun Grover as Aman
Mink Singh Nisha Comeo / Shaina Surgery Raaz 5

Production
The film was shot in Romania in freezing temperature. Apart from Sinaia and other locations the shooting also took place in haunted forest Hoia-Baciu (also known as Hoia Forest), which is known for various mysterious stories and even UFO sightings.

Soundtrack

The film's music is composed by Jeet Gannguli along with the duo Sangeet-Siddharth. The first single from the film, "Sound Of Raaz" was released on 5 July 2016 by T-Series on YouTube. The song, sung by Jubin Nautiyal is a tribute to the tradition of haunting melodies in old horror films. The whole album was released on 19 August 2016.

Critical reception
The Times of India gave the film two and a half stars. Asian Age rated the film one star out of five, levying criticism at the complexity of the plot and supernatural themes.

See also 
 List of Hindi horror films

References

External links

Reboot films
T-Series (company) films
2010s Hindi-language films
2016 films
Films scored by Jeet Ganguly
Films scored by Sangeet Haldipur
Films scored by Siddharth Haldipur
2016 horror films
2016 horror thriller films
Indian horror thriller films
Films shot in Romania
Films set in Romania
Raaz films